"Joy Spring" is a 1954 jazz composition by Clifford Brown that became his signature work. The title was his pet name for his wife Larue.

Early history 
Brown first recorded "Joy Spring" in a studio session led by him on August 6, 1954, at Capitol Recording Studios, in Los Angeles, with Harold Land (tenor sax), Richie Powell (piano), George Morrow (bass), and Max Roach (drums).

Six days later (August 12, 1954), at the same studio, Brown, as leader, recorded Jack Montrose's arrangement of it with Stu Williamson (valve trombone), Zoot Sims (tenor sax), Bob Gordon (baritone sax), Russ Freeman (piano), Joe Mondragon (bass), and Shelly Manne (drums). That take has been issued on several albums, including  Jazz Messages (Jazztone ), Clifford Brown & Max Roach (Pacific Jazz ), and Jazz Imortal – Featuring Zoot Sims (1988; Pacific Jazz ).

Larue Anderson, before marrying Brown, had been a classical music student at the University of Southern California. Without any knowledge of jazz theory – and, in particular, without any knowledge of bebop articulations, phrasing, and the use of half-step progressions, tritone substitutions, and other musical features of the style – she had begun writing a thesis titled "Classics versus Jazz". Max Roach, her friend who introduced her to Brown, took her aside and said: "Honey, the whole world is not built around tonic / dominant." He convinced her to the point that she became a jazz devotee.

Covers 
In 1985, Jon Hendricks wrote lyrics to Brown's music and the song was performed and published by Manhattan Transfer on their album Vocalese with the title "Sing Joy Spring".
 1955, version in the studio album Arranged by Montrose of Jack Montrose
 1957, Oscar Peterson trio with Ray Brown, Herb Ellis At the Opera House
 1958, Lem Winchester and Ramsey Lewis in the album A Tribute to Clifford Brown
 1960, George Shearing with his quintet in the live album On the Sunny Side of the Strip 
 1961, Gary Burton New Vibe Man in Town
 1964, Joe Pass live version in the album Joy Spring
 1981, Stan Getz with his quartet in the album The Dolphin
 1982, Freddie Hubbard in the album Born To Be Blue
 1985,  Larry Coryell, Emily Remler in the album Together.
 1989, McCoy Tyner in the album Things Ain't What They Used To Be 
 1992, Arturo Sandoval in the tribute album I Remember Clifford with Ed Calle and again in 2003 in the album Trumpet Evolution 
 1993, Doug Sert in the album Joy Spring
 1994, Helen Merrill, in the tribute album Brownie: Homage to Clifford Brown 
 1995, Tito Puente in his album Tito's Idea 
 1996, Karrin Allyson in the album Collage
 1998, Billy Taylor in the album Ten Fingers, One Voice
 2003,  Larry Coryell in his album Joy Spring (The Swinging Side Of Larry Coryell) 
 2007, Buddy Rich with his posthumous release in the album Time Out 
 2012, Paolo Fresu with Marco Tamburini, Fabrizio Bosso, Flavio Boltro, Franco Ambrosetti in the album 50 anni suonati.

Filmography 
 1988: Let's Get Lost – "Joy Spring"
 1999: Guinevere – "Joy Spring"

References 

1950s jazz standards
1954 compositions
1954 songs
Jazz compositions
Songs with lyrics by Jon Hendricks
Songs with music by Clifford Brown